Daji is a village on the island of Anjouan in the Comoros. According to the 1991 census, the village had a population of 1,664. The current estimate for 2009 is 2,929 people

References

Populated places in Anjouan